o-Dianisidine is an organic compound with the formula [(CH3O)(H2N)C6H3]2.  A colorless or white solid, it is a bifunctional compound derived via the benzidine rearrangement from o-anisidine.

o-Dianisidine is a precursor to some azo dyes by formation of the bis(diazonium) derivative, which is coupled to diverse aromatic compounds. Some commercial dyes derived from o-dianisidine include C. I. Direct Blue 1, 15, 22, 84, and 98. 

o-Dianisidine is also used in assaying activity of peroxidase in lab. The general reaction of a peroxidase is as follows.
ROOR' + \overset{electron\atop donor}{2e^-} + 2H+ ->[\ce{Peroxidase}] {ROH} + R'OH
Where the ROOR' can be hydrogen peroxide, and the electron donor be o-dianisidine.

Safety
The manufacture and degradation of o-dianisidine, like other benzidene derivatives, has attracted regulatory attention.  It is also used as a reagent in biochemistry in testing for peroxides.

References

Anilines
IARC Group 1 carcinogens
Biphenyls
Diamines